Charlottetown (formerly Hillsborough) is a federal electoral district in Prince Edward Island, Canada, that has been represented in the House of Commons of Canada since 2004. The district, which includes the entire City of Charlottetown, has an area of 46 km2 and a population of 34,562 as of 2011.

Hillsborough was formed in 1966 (from the old Queen's (Prince Edward Island electoral district). It elected its first MP in 1968. It was re=drawn and re-named Charlottetown in 2003.

Demographics
 Ethnic groups: 97.2% White
 Languages: 94.8% English, 2.1% French, 2.5% Other
 Religions: 47.7% Catholic, 39.5% Protestant, 2.5% Other Christian, 8.3% no affiliation
 Average income: $26,205

According to the Canada 2016 Census
 Twenty most common mother tongue languages (2016) : 86.8% English, 3.7% Mandarin, 2.1% French, 1.3% Arabic, 0.6% Nepali, 0.4% Cantonese, 0.4% Spanish, 0.4% Tagalog, 0.3% Farsi, 0.3% Russian, 0.2% Dutch, 0.2% Vietnamese, 0.2% Albanian, 0.2% Korean

History
From 1966 until 2004, most of the Charlottetown riding was part of the riding of Hillsborough. In 2003, there was a riding readjustment; a part of the old Hillsborough riding became part of Cardigan. 96.4% of the riding of Charlottetown was previously part of the Hillsborough riding, and 3.6% was previously part of Malpeque. There were no boundary changes as a result of the 2012 federal electoral redistribution.

Member of Parliament

This riding has elected the following Members of Parliament:

Election results

Charlottetown

2021 general election

2019 general election

2015 general election

2011 general election

2008 general election

2006 general election

2004 general election

Hillsborough

2000 general election

1997 general election

1993 general election

1988 general election

1984 general election

1980 general election

1979 general election

1974 general election

1972 general election

1968 general election

Student Vote results
In a Student Vote, participating Canadian schools to parallel the Canadian federal election results. The vote was designed to educate students and simulate the electoral process for persons who have not yet reached the legal majority. Schools with a large student body that reside in another electoral district had the option to vote for candidates outside of the electoral district then where they were physically located.

2019 election

2015 election

2011 election

See also
 List of Canadian federal electoral districts
 Past Canadian electoral districts

References

Notes

Politics of Charlottetown
Prince Edward Island federal electoral districts